Zindagi Tamasha, titled Circus of Life in English, is a 2019 Pakistani drama film directed by Sarmad Khoosat. It premiered at the 24th Busan International Film Festival, and won awards at Busan and at the 2021 Asian World Film Festival in Los Angeles. The film was set to be released in Pakistan cinemas on 18 March 2022, but was postponed indefinitely following widespread protests by Tehreek-e-Labbaik Pakistan.

As of November 2022, it has still not been released in Pakistan.

Plot 
A devout Muslim who writes, composes, and even records hymns praising the Prophet, Rahat is a respected elderly man who works in real estate and takes care of his bedridden wife. One day, he attends the wedding of a friend's son, where he inadvertently shows off a dance in front of his friends. His dance gets recorded and then uploaded to social media, which then gets broadcast on television. And the chaos begins to ensue in his quiet life. Other than his wife, no one else in the world understands Rahat's circumstances. His daughters and neighbors criticize him, his friends turn their backs on him. Circus of Life provides a calm and detailed picture of challenging issues, in a strict Muslim society and the search for the identity of an elderly man who gradually comes to realize his "minoritiness".

Cast 
 Arif Hassan as Rahat Khawaja
 Samiya Mumtaz
 Eman Suleman as Sadaf
 Ali Kureshi as Danish

Production
Zindagi Tamasha is a Pakistani drama film directed by Sarmad Khoosat.

The name of the film was inspired by a song in Naukar Wohti Da (1974). It is produced by Khoosat's sister, Kanwal Khoosat and written by  Nirmal Bano. The film features Arif Hassan, Eman Suleman, Samiya Mumtaz and Ali Kureshi.

The film was set to release on 24 January 2020 under the banner of Khoosat Films; however, Pakistan's Central Film Censor Board asked director of film to approach the Council of Islamic Ideology for critically reviewing his film. This film shows an intimate portrait of a family who lives in Lahore.

Release 
Zindagi Tamasha premiered at the 24th Busan International Film Festival on 6 October 2019 under the section "A Window on Asian Cinema". The film was set to release on 24 January 2020 under the banner of Khoosat Films, however, Pakistan's Central Film Censor Board asked director of film to approach the Council of Islamic Ideology for critically reviewing his film.

Accolades
Zindagi Tamasha was selected as Pakistan's entry for the Best International Feature Film at the 93rd Academy Awards, but was not nominated.

The film was awarded the Kim Ji-Seok Award at the Busan International Film Festival.

, it had won four awards, including the Snow Leopard Awards for Best Film and Best Actor for Arif Hassan at the 6th Asian World Film Festival in Los Angeles in March 2021.

Controversy
After releasing its first teaser, this film become controversial. Its teaser was removed from YouTube. The release of the film was suspended after religious uproar. Tehreek-e-Labbaik Pakistan's Khadim Hussain Rizvi promoted protests on the release of this film. Rizvi further accused Khoosat of blasphemy. The supposedly "blasphemous" material includes criticism of ulama and an alleged reference to bacha bazi.

Detractors of Rizvi were quick to point out that suggest criticism of ulama is blasphemous, may in itself constitute blasphemy as it implies ulama hold sacred or holy rank. Rizvi was also criticized for using charges of blasphemy to prevent criticism of religious fundamentalism. No charges against Rizvi have been filed at this point for engaging in blasphemy. A petition against TLP was subsequently filed by Irfan Ali Khoosat, director of Khoosat Films. The Sindh government also banned the film.

Soundtrack 
The soundtrack was released on 9 November 2019.

See also
 List of submissions to the 93rd Academy Awards for Best International Feature Film
 List of Pakistani submissions for the Academy Award for Best International Feature Film
 Saakin

References

External links 

2019 films
2010s Urdu-language films
Films directed by Sarmad Khoosat
2010s Punjabi-language films
2019 multilingual films
Pakistani multilingual films
Films set in Lahore